Kim Tae-hwan (born 25 March 2000) is a South Korean football defender who plays for Suwon Samsung Bluewings.

Career statistics

Clubs

References

2000 births
Living people
Association football defenders
South Korean footballers
Suwon Samsung Bluewings players
K League 1 players